The men's 1000 metres in short track speed skating at the 2006 Winter Olympics began on 15 February, with the final on 18 February, at the Torino Palavela.

Records
Prior to this competition, the existing world and Olympic records were as follows:

The following new world and Olympic records were set during this competition.

Results

Heats
The first round was held on 15 February. There were seven heats of three or four skaters each, with the top two finishers and the two fastest third-place finishers also moving on to the quarterfinals. As two skaters tied for the second-fastest third-place time, three skaters advanced through this method. Two other skaters were advanced after being interfered with.

Heats

Quarterfinals
The top two finishers in each of the four quarterfinals advanced to the semifinals.

Quarterfinal 1

Quarterfinal 2

Quarterfinal 3

Quarterfinal 4

Semifinals
The top two finishers in each of the two semifinals qualified for the A final, while the third and fourth place skaters advanced to the B Final. In the first semifinal, China's Li Ye fell, but he was advanced to the final after Belgium's Pieter Gysel was disqualified.

Semifinal 1

Semifinal 2

Finals
The five qualifying skaters competed in Final A. Since only one skater qualified for the B Final (the two disqualified semifinalists did not advance), it was not contested, and China's Li Jiajun was awarded 6th place.

Final A

References

Men's short track speed skating at the 2006 Winter Olympics